The Madhya Pradesh Football Association (MPFA) is one of the 37 Indian state football associations that are affiliated to the All India Football Federation. MPFA is the state governing body of Football in Madhya Pradesh, India. The Madhya Pradesh football team is administered by MPFA. MPFA organises Madhya Pradesh Premier League, the top tier competition of the state (4th in Indian football league system).

Competitions

Madhya Pradesh organises the Madhya Pradesh Premier League in the state of Madhya Pradesh. This is the top tier of the state and overall 4th tier in Indian football league system.

Affiliated teams

References

Football in Madhya Pradesh
2021 establishments in Madhya Pradesh
Sports leagues established in 2021